Asian Highway 48 or AH48 is a transnational route in India and Bhutan, running  from Changrabandha in India to Thimphu in Bhutan.

India
India/Bangladesh border at Changrabandha to Jaigaon at India/Bhutan border.

 Changrabandha - Mainaguri
 Dhupguri - Mainaguri
 Gairkata - Dhupguri
 Birpara - Gairkata
 Birpara - Hasimara
 Hasimara - Jaigaon

Bhutan
India/Bhutan border at Phuentsholing to national capital Thimphu. AH48 is also the national highway number given for this route.

See also
 AH2
 List of Asian Highways

References

External links
 Treaty on Asian Highways with routes

Asian Highway Network
Roads in India
Transport in Bhutan